Martin Traugott Wilhelm Blumner (21 November 1827, Fürstenberg/Havel - 16 November 1901, Berlin) was a German composer, conductor and music theorist. He was the younger brother of the Berlin-born pianist and composer Sigismund Blumner (1826–1893).

Bibliography
Works on and by Martin Blumner on Deutschen Nationalbibliothek
Works on and by Martin Blumner on Deutschen Digitalen Bibliothek
Works on Martin Blumner in Landesbibliographie MV
Entry on Martin Blumner in Sing-Akademie zu Berlin

External links

1827 births
1901 deaths
German composers
German conductors (music)
German male conductors (music)
German music theorists
19th-century German male musicians
19th-century German musicologists